Giovanni Barbo (died 16 January, 1547) was a Roman Catholic prelate who served as Bishop of Pedena (1526–1547).

Biography
On 16 April 1526, Giovanni Barbo was appointed during the papacy of Pope Clement VII as Bishop of Pedena. He served as Bishop of Pedena until his death on 16 January 1547. While bishop, he was principal co-consecrator of Pietro Paolo Vergerio, Bishop of Modruš (1545).

See also 
Catholic Church in Italy

References 

16th-century Roman Catholic bishops in Croatia
Bishops appointed by Pope Clement VII
1547 deaths
Giovanni